A Traveller in War-Time is a non-fiction book by American author Winston Churchill recounting his travels in Europe during World War I.  Released in July 1918 with the full title A Traveller in War-time with an Essay on the American Contribution and the Democratic Idea, the essay comprises about half of the book.  It was Churchill's first non-fiction book.

Especially compared to his string of best-selling novels, the book was not successful, selling only about 8,000 copies.

References

External links
 A Traveller In War-Time at Project Gutenberg
 
 

World War I books
1918 non-fiction books